National Coalition of Freedom-Seekers was a political group reportedly aiming to create a secular political system in Iran, with Mohsen Sazegara and Ghasem Sholeh-Saadi as its lead figures.

Pledging to elect Sazegara as the Mayor of Tehran, they presented a list of candidates for the City Council of Tehran in the 2003 local elections, however none of their candidates were placed among the top 50.

References

2003 establishments in Iran
Political organisations based in Iran